The Fundação Sistema Estadual de Análise de Dados (Statewise System for Data Analysis Foundation), known as Fundação SEADE (SEADE Foundation) is an independent public agency sponsored by the São Paulo state in Brazil. It is linked to São Paulo's Planning and Management Office (Secretaria de Planejamento e Gestão). It is a national reference center in the production and dissemination of socioeconomic and demographic analysis. SEADE perform direct research and data gathering using information produced by other sources, compiling a huge dataset collection and publishing it for free. Those datasets allow picturing several aspects of the socioeconomic reality and historic evolution of the São Paulo state, its regions and municipalities.

Its extensive and diverse product line helps public administrators, businesses, journalists, academics and other citizens to learn about São Paulo's reality, social/economic evolution and allows impact assessment of public policies over its 645 municipalities.

History 

The SEADE Foundation origins remounts to the late XIX century with the creation of the Repartição da Estatística e Arquivo do Estado (State Division for Statistics and Files) on March 1892.

At 1936 the Convenção Nacional de Estatística (National Statistics Convention), endorsed by all Brazilian states, established the mandatory publication of standardized statewide statistical annuaries on a regular basis. In order to produce these reports the Departamento Estadual de Estatística – DEE (State Statistics Department) was created. Regulated by an October 1938 decree, the DEE took over the services of the Repartição da Estatística e do Arquivo and became the new central organization for statistics for the São Paulo state.

In 1950 the DEE was replaced by the Departamento de Estatística do Estado de São Paulo – DEESP (São Paulo's Statistics Department).

In 1976 the DEESP was incorporated by the Coordenadoria de Análise de Dados – CAD (Data Analisis Coordinating Body). The CAD was responsible for the Sistema Estadual de Análise de Dados Estatísticos, created in 1975. In 1978 the Law #1,866 from December 4 created the Fundação Sistema Estadual de Análise de Dados – SEADE. In the following year its statutes were approved by the decree #13,161 when the Foundation got his current juridic form and operating rules.

External links 
 Official Homepage
 Canal do Empresário: Investment planning: Government agencies: SEADE
 Decree # from October 1938: Reorganizes the Repartição de Estatística e Arquivo do Estado
 Law #1,866 from december 4 - Authorization for the creation of the SEADE Foundation by the executive branch
 decree #13,161 - Approval of the SEADE Foundation operational statutes
 Convenção Nacional de Estatística (National Statistics Convention)
 Repartição da Estatística e Arquivo do Estado (State Division for Statistics and Files)

Organisations based in São Paulo